Carepa is a town and municipality in Antioquia Department, Colombia.

Climate
Carepa has a tropical rainforest climate (Af) with heavy to very heavy rainfall year-round.

Notable people
Lina Flórez (1984-), athlete
Hermán Gaviria (1969-2002), Football player

References

Municipalities of Antioquia Department